John Prentiss Poe Sr. (August 22, 1836 – October 14, 1909) was Attorney General of the State of Maryland from 1891 to 1895.  He was born in Baltimore, the son of Neilson Poe and wife Josephine Emily Clemm.  Poe was a second cousin once removed of the poet Edgar Allan Poe as well as a nephew through his mother.

John P. Poe attended Princeton University, graduating with the class of 1854.  He married Anne Johnson Hough and had six sons and three daughters.  All six sons played football for Princeton.  Son Edgar Allan Poe served as state Attorney General from 1911 to 1915.  Another son, Johnny Poe coached at Navy and Virginia, and was killed in the Battle of Loos during World War I.  Art Poe was selected to the College Football Hall of Fame, and Gresham Poe was head coach at Virginia.

John Poe Sr. was a lawyer as well as a leading member of the Maryland Democratic Party, and served as Dean of the University of Maryland School of Law.  He died in Ruxton, Baltimore County, on October 14, 1909, and was buried in Baltimore's Green Mount Cemetery.

His name is lent to the 1904 "Poe Amendment" that sought to disenfranchise black voters in Maryland by introducing grandfather  and "understanding" clauses.  Black voters organized the Negro Suffrage League and established chapters throughout the state in order to marshal opposition to the amendment.  Maryland voters soundly defeated the Poe Amendment by plebiscite.  While Poe was sympathetic and contributed to the text of the amendment, it was drafted by Arthur Pue Gorman, chairman of the Maryland Senate Democratic Caucus from 1903 to 1906.

Literary reference
In the novel Chesapeake, James A. Michener describes racially-disenfranchising legislation proposed by John Prentiss Pope (sic), "dean of the law school at the university".  The author describes a fictitious law, as well as the debate surrounding its motivation and purported merits, using verbiage that parallels the historical Poe Amendment.

References

About the office and list of Attorneys General of Maryland, from the Maryland Archives.

1836 births
1909 deaths
Poe family (United States)
Politicians from Baltimore
Princeton University alumni
Maryland Attorneys General
Lawyers from Baltimore